16P may refer to:

 16P/Brooks, a comet
 SpaceShipOne flight 16P, a commercial spaceflight

See also
 P16 (disambiguation)